The Lunda people of the Luapula River valley in Zambia and DR Congo are called by others the Eastern Lunda to distinguish them from the 'western' Lunda people who remained in the heartland of the former Lunda Kingdom, but they themselves would use Kazembe-Lunda or Luunda with an elongated 'u' to make that distinction. (The name 'Lunda' may also be spelled Luunda).

The Eastern Lunda migrated in the 18th century to their current area under the leader Mwata Kazembe. Their neighbours in northern Zambia to whom they are allied, the Bemba, did so at the same time, and the Eastern Lunda took on the Bemba language in place of the Chilunda, their original language. Their (western) Lunda compatriots in the North-Western Province of Zambia still speak Chilunda however.

Further reading

See the Wikipedia entry for Kazembe for history, geography and culture of the Eastern Lunda.

Ethnic groups in the Democratic Republic of the Congo
Ethnic groups in Zambia
Zambian culture
Society of Zambia

See also 
 Kingdom of Lunda

https://www.tandfonline.com/doi/abs/10.1080/00672700109511698?journalCode=raza20